Hesher is a 2010 American dark comedy drama film co-written and directed by Spencer Susser and starring Joseph Gordon-Levitt, Rainn Wilson, Natalie Portman (who also produced the film), Piper Laurie, and Devin Brochu. It was written by Susser, David Michôd and Brian Charles Frank. Screened at the Sundance Film Festival January 22, 2010, the film was released in the United States on May 13, 2011. Most of the songs on the film's soundtrack are tracks from heavy metal bands Metallica and Motörhead.

Plot
Following the loss of his mother in a car crash, T.J. falls into a state of depression. He becomes obsessed with the car his mother died in and follows it when it is towed away. He and his passive, depressed and pill-taking father Paul live with T.J.'s grandmother Madeleine, where they are soon joined by a squatter, Hesher, a foul-mouthed, tattooed, heavy metal-loving lout.

After school, Dustin, a bully from the towing service, finds his car vandalized and blames T.J., who is saved and taken home by Nicole, a grocery store clerk, who admitted to knowing of the attacks towards him but did nothing until now. Hesher witnesses Dustin attacking T.J., but does nothing. Later, Hesher sets Dustin's car on fire, leading to police questioning T.J., but lack of evidence forces them to let him go. T.J. proceeds to spy on Nicole at the grocery store when Hesher appears and follows her home with T.J. She causes a fender-bender and is verbally assaulted by the other driver, when Hesher comes to her rescue by threatening him. He then takes Nicole and T.J. to a random house that is for sale. There, Hesher trashes the swimming pool and lights the diving board on fire before he shocks Nicole and T.J. by leaving them there alone. When the pair get back to Nicole's broken down car, it has a ticket in the window, at which point Nicole breaks down and cries about how bad her life is.

Later that night, T.J. and Paul get into an argument over dinner. Madeleine is saddened that there is 'nothing she can do', and goes to her room. Hesher says he'll walk with her in the morning, but the next morning, he finds her dead. T.J. steals his dad's credit card and takes money to buy the car back, but is told it's been removed. He decides to give the money to Nicole, but when he gets there she is having sex with Hesher, so he damages his van while telling both of them he doesn't want to see them again and leaves.

He threatens Dustin at his house and finds out the car was taken to be crushed. Dustin begins attacking T.J. until Hesher, who has been following him, appears and drags Dustin off him. T.J. tells him he still doesn't want to see him again and then goes to the junkyard. He climbs in the wrecked car and sleeps, dreaming of his mother's death.
He wakes up when the car is going to be crushed and falls out. He returns home after seeing it destroyed. While getting ready for his grandmother's funeral, Nicole comes and asks for forgiveness and leaves him. At the funeral, T.J. is asked to say words for her, but has nothing to say.

Hesher walks in drunk, resisting efforts to throw him out and demands that the mourners listen to him. He tells a story about how when he was younger he blew up the gas tank of a car and shrapnel destroyed one of his testicles. He then explained that he got caught up in the loss of his testicle focusing on it so much that he forgot he had a right testicle and working penis.  He then draws the parallel: you lost a wife, and you lost a mother; I lost a testicle.  He then announces that he promised Grandma he’d go on a walk with her and proceeds to push the casket out of the room.  T.J. and Paul stand agape and watch Hesher pushing the casket through the road. After a brief hesitation T.J. and Paul run to catch up and take a place on each side with their hands on the casket to help Hesher push and also to join the walk with Grandma.

The next day, Paul shaves for the first time in weeks and tells T.J. that Hesher is gone. Then he shows T.J. the compacted remains of his mother's car, which sits in the driveway.  The screen draws back and then we see on the roof Hesher has spray painted in huge white letters, "Hesher was here."

Cast

Reception
Hesher received mixed reviews upon its release. Review aggregator Rotten Tomatoes reports that 55% of 78 film critics have given the film a positive review, with a rating average of 5.8 out of 10, and a consensus stating "It has a dark sense of humor and a refreshing lack of sentimentality, but like its title character, Hesher isn't really interested in going anywhere." Metacritic, which assigns a weighted average score out of 100 to reviews from mainstream critics, gives the film a score of 45 based on 26 reviews.

Peter Travers of Rolling Stone praised the film and Gordon-Levitt's performance, stating "So what if Hesher flies off its wobbly handles — it keeps springing funny and touching surprises. The performances are aces. Wilson makes Dad's emergence a subtle marvel. And even when the script edges Gordon-Levitt into Hallmark sentiment, you can't take your eyes off him." However, other critics, such as Roger Ebert of the Chicago Sun-Times gave the film more lukewarm reviews. Ebert said, "Hesher assembles a group of characters who aren't sure why they're in the same movie together. One by one, they have an attraction, but brought together, they're all elbows and angles."

References

External links
 
 
 
 

2010 films
2010 comedy-drama films
American comedy-drama films
Films produced by Natalie Portman
Films shot in Los Angeles
Films shot in Ontario
American independent films
2010 independent films
2010 directorial debut films
2010s English-language films
Films directed by Spencer Susser
2010s American films